Susan Lopez Valdes (born November 3, 1964) is a Democratic member of the Florida Legislature representing the State's 64th House district.

Career
Valdes was elected unopposed on 6 November 2018 from the platform of Democratic Party.

References

Hispanic and Latino American state legislators in Florida
Hispanic and Latino American women in politics
Valdes, Susan
Living people
21st-century American politicians
21st-century American women politicians
Women state legislators in Florida
1964 births